Gabbar Singh Gujjar (1926 — 13 November 1959) was a dacoit active in the late 1950s in the Chambal valley of north-central India.

Early life 
Gabbar Singh was born as Gabar Singh in 1926 in Dang village of Gohad Tehsil, Bhind district in the Indian state of Madhya Pradesh. It is situated in the Chambal division. His father's name was Raghuveer Singh .

Dacoity career 
In 1955, Gabbar Singh left his house and village to join the famous Kalyan Singh gang of Bhind. Later, Gabbar formed his own gang between October and December 1956, he committed a series of murders and dacoities in the Indian state of Madhya Pradesh and Uttar Pradesh. In December 1957, he went on to disfigure several persons in Machhuari, Bhakre, Chammodi and Chirenasta villages in Madhya Pradesh.

Reward for capture 
At the time, it was the biggest reward placed on the head of a wanted criminal in India.

In his autobiographical narrative The British the Bandits and the Border Men, Khusro Faramurz Rustamji then the IG (Inspector General) of Police in the Indian state of Madhya Pradesh, details that Gabbar had instilled so much fear in the areas of Dholpur, Bhind, Gwalior and Etawah, that no one dared to leak any information regarding him.

Death 
He died on November 13, 1959 in Jagannath-Ka-Pur village of Bhind district during a gunbattle with the police force. Khusro Faramurz Rustamji, who earlier worked as special security officer to Jawaharlal Nehru decided to present the news of Gabbar's death as a birthday gift to the first Prime Minister of India, Jawaharlal Nehru.

In popular culture
Rajagopal P. V., former Director General of Madhya Pradesh Police, who had gone after several dacoit gangs, edited the book on the criminal history of the real-life of Gabbar Singh during his retirement in Bangalore. The book was released in New Delhi.
Indian Bollywood cinema has made several films based upon Gabbar Singh. The most notable film is Sholay, in which Gabbar Singh was played by Amjad Khan.

References 

1926 births
1959 deaths
Indian outlaws
People shot dead by law enforcement officers in India